The phantom cave snail or phantom cavesnail (Pyrgulopsis texana) is a species of very small freshwater snail with an operculum, an aquatic gastropod in the family Hydrobiidae.

Distribution
This species is endemic to the lower Pecos River basin, Texas, the United States.

Genus transfer
When originally described in 1935, the phantom cave snail was assigned to the genus Cochliopa.  Following a detailed examination of shell and anatomical characteristics along with genetic sequencing it was transferred to the genus Pyrgulopsis in 2010.

References

Further reading
 Dundee D. S. & Dundee H. A. (1969). "Notes Concerning Two Texas Molluscs, Cochliopa texana Pilsbry and Lyrodes cheatumi Pilsbry (Mollusca: Hydrobiidae)". Transactions of the American Microscopical Society 88(2): 205-210. JSTOR
 Cole G. A. (1976). "A New Amphipod Crustacean, Gammarus hyalelloides n. sp., from Texas". Transactions of the American Microscopical Society 95(1): 80-85. JSTOR.

External links
 http://ecos.fws.gov/speciesProfile/profile/speciesProfile.action?spcode=G00X
 http://www.panda.org/about_our_earth/ecoregions/chihuahuan_freshwater.cfm

Molluscs of the United States
Pyrgulopsis
Cave snails
Gastropods described in 1935
Taxonomy articles created by Polbot
Taxobox binomials not recognized by IUCN